The Hotel Gellért is an Art Nouveau hotel on the right river of Danube in Budapest, Hungary. It closed for renovations on December 1, 2021.

History
Construction on the Hotel Saint Gellért started in 1912. The hotel was named for Saint Gellért (St. Gerard Sagredo) the first bishop of Hungary in the 11th Century. The 176-room hotel was designed by Hungarian architects Ármin Hegedűs, Artúr Sebestyén and Izidor Sterk. Work on the hotel slowed due to World War I, and it did not open until September 1918, just as the war was ending and the Austro-Hungarian Empire was descending into chaos. The hotel was commandeered for military use throughout 1919, during the Aster Revolution. Once Hungary was established as an independent country, the hotel proved so financially successful that it was expanded in 1927 with 60 more rooms and a wave pool. Noted Hungarian restaurateur Károly Gundel took over management of the hotel's restaurants in 1927 as well. In 1934, the hotel added a jacuzzi pool.

The hotel was severely damaged in World War II. Post-war Communist authorities removed the "St." from the hotel's name and it became the Hotel Gellért. Restoration of the Gellért Hill wing began in 1946, while work on the main Danube River wing began in 1957. Restoration work was completed in 1962. The hotel was again renovated in 1973. Danubius Hotels assumed management of the hotel in 1981. After the company was privatized in 1992, it purchased the hotel outright in June 1996 and it became the Danubius Hotel Gellért. 

On June 24, 2019, Danubius sold the hotel to Indotek, an investment group, which announced plans to renovate and restore the Gellért and reposition it as a five-star luxury hotel, under the management of an international chain. The hotel closed for renovations on December 1, 2021 and ceased to be operated by Danubius Hotels at that point. The adjoining Gellért Baths remains in operation, as it is independently owned and operated, by the City of Budapest.

Gellért Baths
Hotel Gellért has thermal baths.

Design
The hotel was built in the Secessionist style with some biomorphic elements. The cone-shaped towers of the hotel that frame the hotel make it distinctive from long distances. The interiors of the hotel was built in Art Nouveau style with high glass cupola and wrought iron decoration. The ornamentation of the stairs originating from the hotel reception is a bespoke glass window whose design represents the Chase of the Miraculous Deer from ancient Hungarian mythology. In the spa, the original Art Nouveau ornamentation has artistic mosaics, colorful windows and statues.

During and after World War II the hotel and the thermal baths suffered a great amount of damage. By the end of the 1950s the reconstruction and renovation of the hotel and its spa was started.

Location
From Budapest Ferenc Liszt International Airport the hotel is 21 km away and can be reached by taxi, minibus, or public transport. The principal streets of the city center and the Great Market Hall are just a short ride by public transport or a ten minute walk across the Liberty Bridge.

The closest train station, Kelenföld railway station is just 3 km away and is accessible directly by Line 4 of the Budapest Metro as well as trams and buses that stop in front of the hotel. Budapest Keleti railway station is also easily reached using the Line 4 metro.

Gellért Hill is next to the hotel and the Cave Church and Citadella are reachable on foot for those that can manage going up somewhat steep paths.

Media appearances
 Since it began in 1997, the Balint Balassi Memorial Sword Award international literature prize ceremony has been hosted annually at the hotel.
 The hotel is among the settings of the Video game series Hitman in Hitman: Codename 47 and Hitman: Contracts, under the name Hotel Gallàrd (and known as Hotel Galar in Hitman: Contracts), although it is more often referred within the game as the "Thermal Bath Hotel".
 A music video for the song "You Can Get It" by German Eurodance act Maxx was mostly filmed inside the Gellért Spa in 1994.
 Portions of the 2015 French film, Le Tournoi (The Tournament) were filmed at the hotel.
 The 2018 Italian film, Natale a 5 stelle (5 Star Christmas) was filmed at the hotel.
 A section of the American film Red Sparrow, was filmed at the hotel.
 The hotel has also appeared in:
 The Golden Head (1963)
 A hamis Izabella (1969)
 A Kantor (1970)
 Kojak in Budapest (1980)
 Csontvary (1980)
 Mephisto (1981)
 Io e Mia sorella (1988)
 The Edge of Sanity (1988)
 The Star (1988)
 Eroltetet menet (1988)
 Music Box
 Evita
 Der Brockerer (2000)
 I Spy (2001)
 The Moon and the Stars (2006)

Gallery

See also 
 Balint Balassi Memorial Sword Award
 Gellért Baths

References

External links 

Gellert, Hotel
Gellert
Art Nouveau architecture in Budapest
Gellert